Wang Ying (born 15 August 1983) is a male Chinese freestyle wrestler who will compete at the 2008 Summer Olympics.

His personal best was coming in first at the 2008 Asian Championships.

References
 Profile at 2008teamchina.olympic.cn

External links
 

1983 births
Living people
Chinese male sport wrestlers
Olympic wrestlers of China
Wrestlers at the 2008 Summer Olympics
20th-century Chinese people
21st-century Chinese people